Malcolm Ohanwe (born 1993 in Munich) is a German-Nigerian journalist, media personality and TV host.

Early life and education 
Malcolm Ohanwe was born in Munich, Germany, to a mother of Palestinian descent and a Nigerian father, a barber. He made his journalistic beginnings after graduating from high school as an author for German television network ProSieben, as well as an editor for the German hip hop-themed website Rap2Soul.de Ohanwe studied English Studies, Middle Eastern Studies and Romance Studies at the Ludwig-Maximilians-University in Munich and therefore speaks and works in Arabic, German, English, French, Italian and Spanish).

Career 
On his YouTube channel MalcolmMusic since 2013 he'd feature interviews with a variety of R&B, pop and hip hop performers. Often his interviews would lead to global news coverage as his bold interviewing styl regularly made headlines in predominantly American and British media outlets. Examples include interviews with Tamar Braxton, Christina Milian, Michelle Williams, JoJo, H.E.R., Nivea und Brandy.

Additionally he works as a culture and social politics journalist for the television and radio network Bayerischen Rundfunk (BR). For BR he has been on air as television reporter as well as one of the presenters for the TV show "RESPEKT".

Additionally Ohanwe has served as a television news correspondent for the English language programm of Deutschen Welle where he reported about cultural and political happenings around West Africa from the correspondent studio in Lagos. He also published for the Atlanta based radio station WABE.

Awards 
 2019: International Music Journalism Award. For his Wir sind zu viele: Warum deutscher Pop nicht mehr weiß bleibt (Best Work of Music Journalism, Under 30)

External links

References 

1993 births
Living people
German male journalists
Nigerian journalists
German people of Palestinian descent
German people of Nigerian descent